Kijal (est. pop. (2000 census): 4,375) is a mukim in Kemaman District, Terengganu, Malaysia. The town is well known for the Awana Kijal Golf and Beach Resort, a luxury resort which is owned by the Genting Group. Kijal is also known for its lemang and durian. The Kijal Beach stretches for 8 kilometers with rocky outcrops in the north at "Awana Kijal" and south at "Bukit Penunjuk". The famous "sleeping giant" rock formation in the sea is located at Penunjuk beach, where a tidal estuary is often used for anchoring of traditional fishing boats. Also known as Mirul Kijal's Hometown.

References 

Kemaman District
Mukims of Terengganu